Władysław Piotr Stępień (born 24 October 1946 in Wrzawy) is a Polish politician. He was elected to the Sejm on 25 September 2005, getting 10505 votes in 23 Rzeszów district as a candidate from the Democratic Left Alliance list.

He was also a member of Sejm 1993-1997, Sejm 1997-2001, and Sejm 2001-2005.

See also
Members of Polish Sejm 2005-2007

External links
Władysław Stępień - parliamentary page - includes declarations of interest, voting record, and transcripts of speeches.

1946 births
Living people
Democratic Left Alliance politicians
Members of the Polish Sejm 1993–1997
Members of the Polish Sejm 1997–2001
Members of the Polish Sejm 2001–2005
Members of the Polish Sejm 2005–2007
Polish trade unionists
People from Tarnobrzeg County